Namibia has a 'hybrid' or 'mixed' legal system, formed by the interweaving of a number of distinct legal traditions: a civil law system inherited from the Dutch, a common law system inherited from the British, and a customary law system inherited from indigenous Africans (often termed African Customary Law, of which there are many variations depending on the tribal origin). These traditions have had a complex interrelationship, with the English influence most apparent in procedural aspects of the legal system and methods of adjudication, and the Roman-Dutch influence most visible in its substantive private law. As a general rule, Namibia follows English law in both criminal and civil procedure, company law, constitutional law and the law of evidence; while Roman-Dutch civil law is followed in the Namibian contract law, law of delict (tort), law of persons, law of things, family law, etc. With the commencement in 1994 of the interim Constitution, and in 1997 its replacement, the final Constitution, another strand has been added to this weave.

Namibian law, especially its civil law and common law elements, also forms the basis of the laws of Botswana, Eswatini, Lesotho, Namibia, and Zimbabwe, which were introduced during the process of colonisation. Basutoland (Lesotho) received the law of the Cape Colony in 1884, and Bechuanaland (Botswana) and Southern Rhodesia (Zimbabwe) received it in 1891. Swaziland received the law of the Transvaal Colony in 1904, and South-West Africa (Namibia) received the law of the Cape Province in 1920, after its conquest by South Africa.

Court system in Namibia 

The Namibian court system is organised hierarchically, and consists of (from lowest to highest legal authority): Magistrates' Courts; High Courts; a Supreme Court of Appeal, the highest authority in non-Constitutional matters; and a Constitutional Court, which is the highest authority in constitutional matters. The Constitutional Court has final authority to decide whether an issue is Constitutional or not.
Certain specialised courts have also been provided for by the legislature, in order to avoid backlog in the main legal administration infrastructure. Among these is the Small Claims Court, which resolves disputes involving small monetary sums.
In addition, African indigenous courts, which deal exclusively with indigenous law, also exist. The Constitutional Court is the highest court in the land and deals with all matters, today, this was an alteration made by the state when the question of, 'why is the constitution the highest law in the land but the constitutional court isn't the highest court' thus the evidential change.

History of Namibian  law

Specific fields of law 
 Constitutional law
 Common law
 Customary law
 Law of agency
 Criminal law
 Contract law
 Law of delict
 Property law
 Company law
 Law of partnerships and trusts
 Insolvency law
 Labour law
 Copyright law
 Patent law
 Law of persons
 Family law
 Law of succession
 Administrative law
 Civil procedure
 Criminal procedure
 Legal interpretation
 Environmental law
 Education law
Human rights law

See also
 Advocate: Advocates in Namibia
 Attorneys in Namibia
 Legal systems of the world
 List of law schools in Namibia
 Patent attorney: Namibia

Articles on specific Namibia legislation
 Constitution of Namibia
 List of Acts of the Parliament of Namibia
 Namibian Statutes and other Legislation
 Namibian environmental law

Notes

References
 Zimmermann, Reinhard and Visser, Daniel P. (1996) Southern Cross: Civil Law and Common Law in South Africa Clarendon Press, Oxford,  ;
 Joubert, W. A. et al. (2004) The Law of South Africa LexisNexis Butterworths, Durban, South Africa,  ;

External links